Euconulidae is a taxonomic family of minute, air-breathing land snails, terrestrial pulmonate gastropod mollusks or micromollusks in the superfamily Trochomorphoidea.

This land snail family is closely allied to the Zonitidae, the glass snails.

Taxonomy
The family Euconulidae was originally placed within the superfamily Gastrodontoidea according to the taxonomy of the Gastropoda (Bouchet & Rocroi, 2005). Since 2017, its classification has been revised and it now belongs to the superfamily Trochomorphoidea

Distribution
The distribution of the Euconulidae includes the Nearctic, the western-Palearctic, the eastern-Palearctic, the Neotropical zone, the Ethiopian zone, Malagasy, south-eastern Asia, Australia, Polynesia and Hawaii.

Humidity, temperature, rainfall, and foliar dripping derived from dew, mist, and rain, affect the behavior and substrate selection of small terrestrial molluscs, such as Tikoconus costarricanus, which inhabit shrubs in humid tropical montane forests. There is also a preference of some parts of a leaf, for example, in some cases the lower side is preferred, possibly because it has better humidity and protects small snails from the impact of raindrops.

Shell description
These minute snails have a shell which is roundly conical and broad-based, like the shape of an old-fashioned European woven bee hive or skep. For this reason these snails are sometimes known as "hive snails".

The shells of most Euconulidae are only about 3 mm in size, amber-colored and translucent.

Anatomy
In this family, the number of haploid chromosomes lies between 26 and 30 (according to the values in this table).

Genera
Subfamilies and genera in the family Euconulidae include:

Euconulinae
 Afroconulus Van Mol & van Bruggen, 1971
 Afroguppya de Winter & Bruggen, 1992
 Afropunctum F. Haas, 1934
 Cancelloconus I. Rensch, 1932
 Coneuplecta Möllendorff, 1893
 Diepenheimia Preston, 1913
 Discoconulus Reinhardt, 1883
 Dryachloa F. G. Thompson & H. G. Lee, 1980
 Euconulus Reinhardt, 1883 - type genus of the family Euconulidae
 Guppya Mörch, 1867
 Habroconus Crosse & P. Fischer, 1872
 Kororia H. B. Baker, 1941
 Louisia Godwin-Austen, 1908
 Luchuconulus Pilsbry, 1928
 Palaua H.B. Baker, 1941
 Papuarion Van Mol, 1973
 Parasitala Thiele, 1931
 Sabalimax Tillier & Bouchet, 1989
 Serostena Iredale, 1941
 Tikoconus Barrientos, 2019
 Velifera W.G. Binney, 1879

Microcystinae
 Allenoconcha Preston, 1913
 Aukena Baker, 1940
 Buffetia Iredale, 1945  (nomen nudum)
 Cookeana
 Diastole Gude, 1913
 Faunulena
 Greenwoodoconcha
 Hiona Cooke, 1940
 Innesoconcha Iredale, 1944
 Iredaleoconcha Preston, 1913
 Kaala
 Kusaiea Baker, 1938
 Lamprocystis
 Liardetia
 Melloconcha Iredale, 1944
 Mendana
 Microcystis
 Nancibella
 Periclocystis
 Philonesia Sykes, 1900
 Piena
 Pukaloa
 Tengchiena

Cladogram
The following cladogram shows the phylogenic relationships of this family with the other families within the limacoid clade:

References

External links